David Krška (born 4 August 1994) is a Czech football player who currently plays for FC Zbrojovka Brno.

References
 Profile at FC Zbrojovka Brno official site
 Profile at Moravskoslezská fotbalová liga official site

1994 births
Living people
Czech footballers
FC Zbrojovka Brno players
Footballers from Brno
SK Líšeň players

Association football forwards
SK Hanácká Slavia Kroměříž players
Czech National Football League players